Orri Páll Dýrason (born on 4 July 1977) is an Icelandic musician. He was previously the drummer for Sigur Rós.  He joined the band in 1999, shortly after the recording of the studio album Ágætis byrjun, when the previous drummer, Ágúst Ævar Gunnarsson, left the band.

Orri has recorded five studio albums with Sigur Rós:  (2002), Takk... (2005), Með suð í eyrum við spilum endalaust (2008), Valtari (2012), and Kveikur (2013). He also contributed to Hvarf/Heim (2007), where "Hvarf" contains studio recordings of previously unreleased songs.

Personal life 
Orri's father is the former footballer Dýri Guðmundsson, who made five appearances for the Icelandic national team.

Orri has a daughter, Vaka, for whom the first track from the  album is named. and two sons, Dýri Angantýr (born January 2010), and Jón Stormur (born November 2012). He's also the stepfather to his fiancé's daughter, Kría (born July 2008).

He is married to María Lilja Þrastardóttir, a journalist and a feminist activist from Iceland. They are currently living in London.

In September 2018, he was accused of sexual assault by a fan on Instagram. Orri published a post on Facebook where he claims his innocence but "in light of the scale of this matter" he chose to step down from the band whilst attempting to clear his name.

References 

1977 births
Alternative rock drummers
Living people
Orri Pall Dyrason
Orri Pall Dyrason
Rock drummers
Orri Pall Dyrason
21st-century drummers

fi:Orri Páll Dýrason